Richard Redgrave  (30 April 1804 in Pimlico, London – 14 December 1888 in Kensington, London) was an English landscape artist, genre painter, and administrator.

Early life
He was born in Pimlico, London, at 2 Belgrave Terrace, the second son of William Redgrave, and younger brother of Samuel Redgrave. While employed in his father's manufacturing firm, he visited the British Museum to make drawings of the marble sculptures there.  His work The River Brent, near Hanwell of 1825 saw him admitted to the Royal Academy schools the next year.  He left his father's firm in 1830 and began to make a living teaching art.

Career

He worked at first as a designer.  He was elected an Associate in 1840 and an Academician in 1851 (retired, 1882).  His Gulliver on the Farmer's Table (1837) made his reputation as a painter. He became an assiduous painter of landscape and genre; his best pictures being Country Cousins (1848), Olivia's Return to her Parents (1839), The Sempstress (1844) and A Well-spring in the Forest (1877).  Redgrave held three important exhibitions at the Royal Academy and one at Royal Society of Painter-Etchers and Engravers.

He began in 1847 a connection with the Government School of Design, as botanical lecturer and teacher, he became head-master in 1848, and art superintendent in 1852. He was inspector-general for art at the Science and Art Department in 1857.  The first Keeper of Paintings at South Kensington Museum, he was greatly instrumental in the establishment of this institution, and he claimed the credit of having secured the Sheepshanks and Ellison gifts for the nation. 
Redgrave received the cross of the Legion of Honour after serving on the executive committee of the British section of the Paris Exhibition of 1855. The income provided for an impressive house at Hyde Park Gate, overlooking the park, in one of the most prestigious addresses in London. His children Evelyn Leslie Redgrave and Frances M Redgrave were celebrated painters.

He was surveyor of crown pictures from 1856–80, during which period he produced a 34-volume catalogue detailing the pictures at Windsor Castle, Buckingham Palace, Hampton Court, and other royal residences.

Redgrave and his brother Samuel were the co-authors of the influential A Century of Painters of the English School, published in 1866, he also wrote also An Elementary Manual of Colour, 1853.

Later life 

He was offered, but declined, a knighthood in 1869.

He died at 27 Hyde Park Gate, Kensington, London, on 14 December 1888 and is buried in Brompton Cemetery.

Gallery

References

Bibliography

External links 

 
Richard Redgrave | Artist | Royal Academy of Arts
Richard Redgrave 1804-1888 | Tate
Biography of Richard Redgrave, CB, RA - Victoria and Albert Museum

1804 births
1888 deaths
19th-century English painters
English male painters
English landscape artists
Artists from London
People from Pimlico
Surveyors of the Queen's Pictures
Burials at Brompton Cemetery
Royal Academicians
19th-century English male artists